"Give It Away" is a song by British electronic music group Deepest Blue. It was released on 16 February 2004 as the second single from their debut album, Late September. It gave them their second hit on the UK Singles Chart, peaking at number nine, while being their most successful single on the Scottish Singles Chart, where it peaked at number five and also reached number 36 in Ireland.

Track listings

UK CD single
 "Give It Away" (radio edit)
 "Give It Away" (club edit)
 "Give It Away" (club mix)
 "Give It Away" (Michael Woods Remix)
 "Give It Away" (Camel Riders Mirage Remix)
 "Give It Away" (enhanced video)

UK 12-inch single
A1. "Give It Away" (club mix)
B1. "Give It Away" (Michael Woods Remix)
B2. "Give It Away" (Camel Riders Mirage Remix)

Italian 12-inch vinyl
A1. "Give It Away" (club mix)
B1. "Give It Away" (original radio edit)
B2. "Give It Away" (Camel Riders Mirage Remix)

Charts

Weekly charts

Year-end charts

References

2003 songs
2004 singles
Data Records singles
Deepest Blue songs
Songs written by Matt Schwartz